Anwar Jassam (born 1947 in Baghdad) is a former Iraq national football coach.

Jassam won the 1978–79 Iraqi League with Al-Zawraa and also won 5 Iraq FA Cup titles with them, more than any other manager in the history of the Iraq FA Cup.

References

Sportspeople from Baghdad
Living people
1947 births
Iraqi footballers
Iraqi football managers
Iraq national football team managers
Association football defenders
Al-Zawraa SC managers
Iraqi expatriate football managers